53rd km is a rural locality (a settlement) in Novonezhinskoye Rural Settlement of Shkotovsky District, Primorsky Krai, Russia. The population was 30 in 2010.

Geography 
The settlement is located in the Suhodol River valley, 11 km from Smolyaninovo and 110 km from Vladivostok.

Streets 
 Zheleznodorzhnaya

References 

Rural localities in Primorsky Krai